is a city located in Gunma Prefecture, Japan. , the city had an estimated population of 108,991 in 49,745 households, and a population density of 400 persons per km2.

Geography
Kiryū is in the southeast part of Gunma, in the northern Kantō Plain near the Tochigi border. The city is also not far from Mount Akagi, a large but dormant volcano. 
The city consists of two separate geographic areas, with the city of Midori sandwiched in between. Situated at the foot of Mount Akagi, the city boasts one of the most beautiful settings in the Kantō region. Two rivers, the Kiryū and the Watarase River, run through the heart of the city and it is likewise surrounded by picturesque mountains to the north. Umeda, a district on the north side of the city, is well known for its cedar trees, while red pines are also common in other areas.

Surrounding municipalities
Gunma Prefecture
 Maebashi
 Isesaki
 Ōta
 Midori
 Numata
Tochigi Prefecture
 Ashikaga
 Sano

Climate
Kiryū has a Humid continental climate (Köppen Cfa) characterized by warm summers and cold winters with heavy snowfall.  The average annual temperature in Kiryū is 14.1 °C. The average annual rainfall is 1297 mm with September as the wettest month. The temperatures are highest on average in August, at around 26.4 °C, and lowest in January, at around 2.8 °C.

Demographics
Per Japanese census data, the population of Kiryū peaked around the year 1980 and has declined steadily over the past 50 years.

History
Kiryū is located within traditional Kōzuke Province and has been noted since the Nara period for production of fabrics. The place name appears in the Kamakura period Azuma Kagami. During the Edo period, most of the area of present-day Kiryū was part of the tenryō holding under the direct administration of the Tokugawa shogunate, with the exception of the commercial center and temple town of Kiryū-shinmachi, noted for sericulture since the Nara period, which was part of Shōnai Domain of Dewa Province. The area also prospered from its location on the Kiryū and Watarase rivers.

Kiryū Town was created within Yamada District, Gunma Prefecture on April 1, 1889 with the creation of the modern municipalities system after the Meiji Restoration. It was raised to city status on March 1, 1921. Kiryū annexed the neighboring village of Sakaino on April 1, 1933 and village of Hirosawa on April 1, 1937. The city expanded further with the annexation of Umeda, Aioi and part of Kawauchi village on October 1, 1954.
On June 13, 2005, Kiryū absorbed the villages of Niisato and Kurohone (both from Seta District).

Government
Kiryū has a mayor-council form of government with a directly elected mayor and a unicameral city council of 22 members. Kiryū contributes three members to the Gunma Prefectural Assembly. In terms of national politics, the city is divided between the Gunma 1st district and the Gunma 2nd district of the lower house of the Diet of Japan.

Economy
Traditionally, Kiryū's principal industry was sericulture and silk textile manufacturing, with records dating silk production as far back as 713 AD.   Pachinko manufacturing arrived in Kiryū after World War II, during the period of industrial reconstruction, with the formation of two main companies—the Heiwa Corporation in 1949, and the Sophia Corporation in 1951. Kiryū's factories are responsible for manufacturing 60% of Japan's pachinko machines.   However, the decreased demand for silk goods and the closure of several area manufacturing concerns have caused the local economy to suffer.

Mitsuba Corporation, a major manufacturer of automotive parts is headquartered in the city.

Education
Kiryū has 17 public elementary schools and ten public middle schools operated by the city government, and six public high schools operated by the Gunma Prefectural Board of Education. There are also two private middle schools and two private high schools.
There are six public and two private high schools, ten public and two private middle schools, and seventeen public elementary schools in Kiryū. The prefecture also operates three special education schools for the handicapped. The Engineering department of Gunma University is located in the Tenjin district of the city.

Transportation

Railway
 JR East – Ryōmō Line
  
 Watarase Keikoku Railway – Watarase Keikoku Line
  -  -  -  – ( - ) -   - 
 Jōmō Electric Railway Company - Jōmō Line
  -  -  – -  -  -  -  - 
 Tōbu Railway – Tōbu Kiryū Line
  -

Highway

Local attractions
Having been virtually untouched by bombs during World War II, the city boasts one of the greatest concentrations of pre-war architecture in all of Japan. 
Kiryugaoka Amusement Park
Kiryugaoka Zoo
Kiryu Nature Sanctuary
 Kiryu Motorboat Race Course
Gunma Insect World
Okawa Museum of Art
Textile Museum Yukari
 Tenmangu Shrine
 Takei temple ruins, National Historic Site

Saw-tooth roof structures 

Kiryu is especially known in the area for saw-tooth roof structures. The official mascot of Kiryu city is a saw-tooth themed character named Kinopi (キノピー). Many of these saw-tooth structures are still in use today, re-purposed for various businesses.

The Silk Weaver’s Apprentice and the Kiryu Spirit (Manga Series) 
Kiryū City officially released a manga titled The Silk Weaver’s Apprentice and the Kiryū Spirit in collaboration with Tokyo-based publisher Manga Planet. The series is being simultaneously released in both English and Japanese on Manga Planet's official website.
According to website, in the manga Princess Shirataki, the spirit of the Kiryū traditional weaving art, takes the form of a young girl and appears suddenly before an apprentice of the Kiryū tradition and his childhood friend, a girl going to Tokyo College of Art. These three live together, learn the seven techniques of the Kiryū art and discover how to use it in modern-day fashion.

Sister-city relations
  - Hitachi, Ibaraki, since June 18, 1965
  - Biella, Piemonte, Italy, since October 12, 1963
 - Columbus, Georgia,  United States of America, since June 16, 1977
  - Naruto, Tokushima, since September 18, 1980

Noted people
 Kenkichi Iwasawa (1917-1998), mathematician
 Mao Murakami (born 1995), dancer
 Naoki Matsuda (1977-2011), professional soccer player
 Shūzō Oshimi (born 1981), manga writer and artist
 Ryoko Shinohara (born 1973), actress
 Chihiro Yamanaka (born 1976), pianist
 Saori Yuki (born 1948), singer
 Yukio Araki (1928-1945), youngest-known Japanese Kamikaze pilot killed in World War II
 Jun Takahashi (born 1969), Japanese fashion designer and founder of UNDERCOVER

In Pop Culture 
Unofficial sources state that in the Pokemon franchise, Route 3 in the Kanto Region was modeled after Kiryū.

References

External links

 
Official Website 
The Silk Weaver’s Apprentice and the Kiryu Spirit (Manga Series)

Cities in Gunma Prefecture
Kiryū, Gunma